The 2021 Trampoline Gymnastics World Championships were held from 18 to 21 November 2021 in the National Gymnastics Arena in Baku, Azerbaijan.

Participating nations

  (2)
  (2)
  (1)
  (8)
  (7)
  (5)
  (3)
  (14)
  (13)
  (6)
  (1)
  (8)
  (2)
  (12)
  (1)
  (5)
  (23)
  (5)
  (1)
  (1)
  (4)
  (15)
  (4)
  (6)
  (2)
  (22)
  RGF  (27)
  (3)
  (14)
  (5)
  (3)
  (15)
  (20)

Medal summary

Medal table

Notes

References

Trampoline Gymnastics World Championships
World Championships
Trampoline Gymnastics World Championships
International sports competitions hosted by Azerbaijan
Sports competitions in Baku
Trampoline Gymnastics World Championships